Recurse is the debut studio album released by American electro-industrial band Finite Automata.  It was released on December 29, 2012, by Beyond Therapy Records in digital format, and released on compact disc on February 22, 2013.

The album features reworked and re-recorded material from the group's previous demo-release Here Won No One, as well as reworked material written between 2007 and 2010. Its name is a reference to the computer science concept of recursion, and alludes to conflict that feeds back into itself.

Track listing

Personnel
Mod Eschar - producer, vocals, lyrics, sampling, programming
c. Grendel - synthesizers, keyboards, programming
Mat Syn - synthesizers, guitars, bass
Josh Hack - recording engineer
Eric Sochocki - mastering

Samples

 A number of the samples from "Filth In Eyes" are taken from Roman Polanski's film The Tenant.
 A number of the samples from "Normalcy" are taken from home video recordings by David Koresh
 A sample from the beginning of "The Shroud" was taken from the 1991 segment of Unsolved Mysteries entitled "Allagash Abductions", and the end of the song samples part of the Jim Jones suicide recording.

References 

2012 debut albums
Finite Automata (band) albums